Higashiyama Station may refer to:

 Higashiyama Station (Kyoto), a subway station on the Karasuma Line
 Higashiyama Station (Hokkaidō), a railway station on the Hakodate Main Line
 Higashiyama Station (Nara), a railway station on the Kintetsu Ikoma Line 
 , a railway station in Japan